Kalba is a city in the Emirate of Sharjah in the United Arab Emirates (UAE). It is an exclave of Sharjah lying on the Gulf of Oman coast north of Oman. Khor Kalba (Kalba Creek), an important nature reserve and mangrove swamp, is located south of the town by the Omani border. 

Kalba Mangrove reserve is open to the public and was developed as an eco-tourism resort by the Sharjah Investment and Development Authority (Shurooq). A number of conservationists and ecologists have expressed concern regarding the project.

History 

Shell middens dating back to the fourth millennium BCE have been found at Kalba, as well as extensive remains of Umm Al Nar era settlement. An extensive and important assembly of petroglyphs lies to the south of Kalba at Khatm Melaha.

Portuguese 
The town was captured by the Portuguese Empire in the 16th century and was referred to as Ghallah. It was part of a series of fortified cities that the Portuguese used to control access to the Persian Gulf and the Gulf of Oman, e.g. Khor Fakan, Muscat, Sohar, Seeb, Qurayyat, Muttrah. Kalba Fort, today restored as a museum, is thought to have been constructed on Portuguese foundations.

It was attacked and sacked by the Sultan of Muscat's forces in March 1811 as part of the ongoing Omani campaign against the maritime forces of Al-Qasimi. It was a Trucial State from 1936 to 1951, before being reincorporated into Sharjah.

Kalba was still being referred to as Ghallah at the time of J. G. Lorimer's 1906 survey of the Persian Gulf and Oman, when it consisted of some 300 areesh (date palm frond) houses, of Naqbiyin, Sharqiyin, Kunud and Abadilah tribes as well as a number of Baluchis and Persians. It was home to ten boats trading with ports in the Persian Gulf and India.

Majid bin Sultan bin Saqr Al Qasimi was granted the Shamaliyah region, including Kalba, as a fiefdom by his brother, Sheikh Salim bin Sultan Al Qasimi, Ruler of Sharjah. Kalba was subsequently ruled jointly by his two sons Hamad bin Majid and Ahmad bin Majid.

Hamad's son Said Bin Hamad Al Qasimi succeeded him in 1902, at the time when the ruler of neighbouring Fujairah, Hamad bin Abdallah Al Sharqi, managed to establish independence. Said bin Hamad lived in Ajman, leaving the administration of Kalba in the hands of a slave named Barut.

Trucial state 
By the 1920s, Said bin Hamad took up residency in Kalba again and in 1936 was recognised by the British as a Trucial Ruler as an incentive to grant landing rights to an emergency air-strip as a backup to the Imperial Airways runway and fort at Al-Mahatta in the city of Sharjah.

In April 1937, the deposed Ruler of Sharjah, Khalid bin Ahmad Al Qasimi, married Aisha, the daughter of Sheikh Said bin Hamad Al Qasimi. Said bin Hamad died suddenly at the end of April 1937 while visiting Khor Fakkan. Said bin Hamad's son, Hamad, was still a minor and so Aisha moved quickly to establish a regency, travelling to Kalba and organising the town's defences. For many years Said bin Hamad had lived in Ajman and entrusted a slave by the name of Barut to manage Kalba on his behalf, and Aisha now arranged for Barut to once again take charge as Wali. She sent a message to Khalid bin Ahmad, who was in Ras Al Khaimah at the time.

A period of intense political infighting and negotiation between the many involved parties now followed. In June 1937, the notable residents of Kalba selected the slave Barut as Regent for the 12-year-old Hamad, but this solution was not accepted by the British and Khalid bin Ahmad was selected as regent. Increasingly seen as an influential and unifying figure by the Bedouin and the townspeople of the East Coast, he ruled over Dhaid and Kalba (delegating his rule in Kalba to Barut and choosing himself to live in Dhaid and Al Heera) until 1950, when he was too old and infirm to take a further role in affairs. He died that year and the rule of Kalba reverted to the direct administration of Sharjah. Although there are British records of an insurgency in 1952 this appears to have been settled.

That notwithstanding, there were almost constant outbreaks of squabbling and disputes between Kalba and neighbouring Fujairah (itself only recognised as a Trucial State by the British in 1952) which broke out into open fighting over a land dispute after the UAE was founded in 1971 and, in 1972 the newly founded Union Defence Force was called in to take control of the fighting which, by the time the UDF moved in, had killed 22 and seriously injured a dozen more. The dispute was finally settled after mediation between Sheikh Rashid of Dubai and other Rulers and a statement announcing the settlement sent out on 17 July 1972.

City access 
Khor Kalba is accessible by three roads.

The first merges after Wadi Al Helou tunnel with Maliha Road which finally leads to the Sharjah-Kalba Road from Sharjah International Airport. There is also the Fujairah-Kalba Road.

The Khor Kalba Road extends until the border with Oman at Khatm Melaha, and is one of the exit–entry points between the UAE and Oman.

Sultan bin Muhammad Al Qasimi Development Projects 
Sultan bin Muhammad Al Qasimi, Ruler of Sharjah and member of the Supreme Council, announced in July 2020 that several development projects are to be implemented in Kalba. These include the restoration of historical sites, the development of the corniche, the renovation of public spaces, the construction of new buildings, and others.

Kalba Beach Corniche 
Launched in April 2021, the Kalba Beach Corniche project targeted improving rainwater drainage, the construction of a running track, the establishment of public seating areas and the planting of trees.

Kalba Ice Factory 

The Kalba ice factory, originally constructed to provide ice for local fishermen, stood as a ruin for decades before it was rebuilt as an art space by the Sharjah Art Foundation - one of a number of restorations of heritage buildings in the Emirate of Sharjah by the Foundation (including the Flying Saucer) for use as public spaces.

Rulers 
Majid bin Sultan Al Qasimi (1871–1900)
Hamad bin Majid Al Qasimi (1900–1903)
Said ibn Hamad Al Qasimi (1903–30 April 1937)
Hamad bin Said Al Qasimi (30 April 1937 – 1951)
Saqr bin Sultan Al Qasimi (1951–1952; Ruler of Sharjah from 1951–1965)

Britain recognized Kalba on 8 December 1936, and it was re-incorporated into Sharjah in 1952.

Gallery

See also 
 Al Hefaiyah Conservation Centre
 Emirate of Sharjah
 Sharjah
 Sharjah Electricity and Water Authority

References

External links 

Populated places in the Emirate of Sharjah
Former countries in the Middle East
States and territories established in 1903
1952 disestablishments
Cities in the United Arab Emirates
Archaeology of the United Arab Emirates